Markus Tressel (born 17 April 1977) is a German politician of Alliance 90/The Greens who served as a member of the Bundestag from the state of Saarland from 2009 until 2021. From 2016 until 2021, he also was the party's co-chair in Saarland, alongside Tina Schöpfer.

Early life and career 
In 1996 Tressel graduated from the Max-Planck-Gymnasium in Saarlouis, where he was student representative. He dropped out of his studies of political and administrative sciences at Saarland University in 2000 in favour of a position as state manager for the regional association of the Green Party in Saarland.

Political career 
Tressel became a member of the Bundestag in the 2009 German federal election, representing the Saarlouis district. He is a member of the Committee on Food and Agriculture and the Committee on Tourism. For his parliamentary group he serves as spokesman for rural areas and regional policy and for tourism policy.

In February 2021, Tressel announced that he would not stand in the 2021 federal elections but instead resign from active politics by the end of the parliamentary term.

References

External links 

  
 Bundestag biography 

1977 births
Living people
Members of the Bundestag for Saarland
Members of the Bundestag 2017–2021
Members of the Bundestag 2013–2017
Members of the Bundestag 2009–2013
Members of the Bundestag for Alliance 90/The Greens